Balow is a municipality in the Ludwigslust-Parchim district, in Mecklenburg-Vorpommern, Germany.

Balow was developed as an East German model village, and is known for its community sports programs. A machine shop in Balow produces transport boxes for the assembly lines of large companies, including Daimler Benz.

References

Ludwigslust-Parchim